The University of New South Wales Killer Whales Water Polo Club is an Australian club water polo team that competes in the National Water Polo League.  They are a women's team and are based at University of New South Wales.

References

External links
 
 

Sporting clubs in Sydney
Water polo clubs in Australia
University and college sports clubs in Australia
University of New South Wales student organisations
Women's sports teams in Australia
Women's water polo